The Honourable William Townshend (9 June 1702 – 29 January 1738) was a British Member of Parliament.

Townshend was the third son of Charles Townshend, 2nd Viscount Townshend, and his first wife the Hon. Elizabeth Pelham. Charles Townshend, 3rd Viscount Townshend, Thomas Townshend and Roger Townshend were his brothers and George Townshend, 1st Marquess Townshend, and Charles Townshend his nephews. He was elected to the House of Commons for Great Yarmouth in 1723, a seat he held until his death. He lived at Honingham Hall in Norfolk.

Townshend married Henrietta, daughter of Lord William Powlett, in May 1725. Their son Charles was created Baron Bayning in 1797. Townshend died in January 1738, aged only 35. His wife died in 1755.

See also
Marquess Townshend
Baron Bayning

References

External links

1702 births
1738 deaths
Younger sons of viscounts
William Townshend
Members of the Parliament of Great Britain for English constituencies
British MPs 1722–1727
British MPs 1727–1734
British MPs 1734–1741
Politics of the Borough of Great Yarmouth
People from Honingham